Alex Abdullah Abbad (born June 18, 1978), sometimes known as Alex Abbad, is an Indonesian actor, poet, host, musician, visual artist, and music producer, with two decades of experience in the Creative and Entertainment Industry.

Career

He started off his career as MTV Asia VJ in the 90's and rose to become Indonesia's leading actor. He is very well regarded as a character actor who takes exceptionally challenging roles.

He starred in an HBO Original Series Halfworlds (2015) directed by Joko Anwar In addition, Alex also starred in The Raid 2 (2014) and in Merantau (2009), both directed by Gareth Evans.

As for accolades and recognition Alex also won the Festival Film Indonesia (FFI) for Best Supporting Actor in My Stupid Boss (2016) and also nominated for the same category the next year for Night Bus (2017).

Filmography

Film

Television series

Awards and nominations

References

External links

 Berita

1978 births
Living people
Indonesian people of Yemeni descent
Indonesian actors
Male actors from Jakarta
Indonesian television presenters
VJs (media personalities)